Two United States Navy destroyers have been named USS Shaw, after John Shaw, a notable officer in the early days of the Navy.

 , commissioned 1917, decommissioned 1922, transferred to the United States Coast Guard in 1926.
 , commissioned 1936, decommissioned 1945.

United States Navy ship names